Bory de Bori és Borfői was an old Hungarian noble family who dated back to 1275. The family was elevated by Ladislaus IV of Hungary, primarily because of their heroic war commitment against the Bohemian King Ottokar II. Přemysl. As a result, the family received land in modern-day Slovakia, which was named Bory.

History 
At the beginning of the 16th century, many family members fought with the Austrian Imperial army against the armies of the Ottoman Empire. The Ottoman Empire was pushing through the Hont County, however Mihaly Bory successfully defended the Nógrád and Drégely castles. Paul Bory fell in the Battle of Szikszó (8. October 1588).

In 1665 Emperor Leopold I chose a second Mihaly Bory to be the Kaptain of Krupina (German: Karpfen, Hungarian: Korpona). Additionally, Mihaly was a very close friend and supporter of Count Ferenc Wesselényi de Hadad et Murány. For this reason, Count Ferenc Wesselényi appointed him as ambassador to Archbishop-Elector of Mainz Johann Philipp von Schönborn. Mihaly's son Gabor was defender of the Léva Castle during the Rákóczi Uprising.

During the 18th and 19th century many members married into famous and lesser famous noble families: Csiffary, Osztroluczky, Dúló, Palásthy, Akács, Pomothy, Dalmady, Kalnay, Madách, Baron Lipthay, Baron Hellenbach, Baron Vecsey, Gosztonyi, Sembery and Count Balassa.

Members 

 Mihaly Bory de Bori és Borfői (cca. 1650) Kaptain of Krupina, ambassador to Archbishop-Elector of Mainz Johann Philipp von Schönborn and friend of Count Ferenc Wesselenyi.
 Joannes Bory de Bori és Borfői (1740–1807) Hont County Court Judge.
 Nicolaus Bory de Bori és Borfői (1783–1829) Hungarian royal court counselor, husband of Baroness Carolina Hellenbach de Paczolay. She was a member of the Sternkreuzorden.
 Michael Bory de Bori és Borfői (1825 - cca. 1900) administrative officer in Demandice.
 Jenő Bory de Bori és Borfői (1879–1959) famous constructor of the Bory Castle.

References 

Hungarian noble families